The Bahamas Women's Open was a professional tennis tournament played on outdoor hard courts. It was part of the International Tennis Federation (ITF) Women's Circuit. It was held at the National Tennis Centre in Nassau, Bahamas from 2011 to 2012.

Past finals

Singles

Doubles

External links
Official website
ITF search

ITF Women's World Tennis Tour
Hard court tennis tournaments
Recurring sporting events established in 2011
Recurring sporting events disestablished in 2012
Defunct tennis tournaments in the Bahamas
Defunct sports competitions in the Bahamas
2011 establishments in the Bahamas
2012 disestablishments in the Bahamas